In computer security, macaroons are authorization credentials that support decentralized delegation between principals.

Macaroons are used in a variety of systems, including the Ubuntu Snappy package manager, the HyperDex data store, the Matrix communication protocol, and the Python Package Index.

Claims

A macaroon is composed of series of "caveats", for example:

 may upload files to /user/A/ (issued by server)
 only to /user/A/album/123 (derived by A)
 only GIFs, up to 1MB (derived by B)
 until noon today (derived by C)

The macaroon model doesn't specify the language for these caveats; The original paper proposes a model of subjects and rights, but the details are left to individual implementations.

Related technologies 
Macaroons are similar to some other technologies.

Compared to JSON Web Token (JWT):
 Holder of macaroon can issue a sub-macaroon with smaller power, while JWT is fixed
 Macaroon is notably longer than JWT
 Macaroon is equivalent to signed JWT, but does not offer equivalent to encrypted JWT
Compared to Certificates
 Macaroons are based on a symmetric model, while certificates on asymmetric
 Macaroons are computationally cheaper and require simpler cryptographic primitives
Using a macaroon (sent to a server) can disclose some private information held by the macaroon holder, meaning that server must be trusted; Using a certificate means signing a payload using a private key, which is not sent to the server, thus communication with untrusted servers is less risky.

Invalidation

Implementations need to decide whether the entire macaroon tree is invalidated at once from its root, the server secret key; or if intermediate macaroons are to be blacklisted, comparable to time-bound JWT's.

See also

 Authorization
 HTTP cookie
 OAuth
 OpenID
 Simple public-key infrastructure

References

Computer access control